USS Plover (AMc-3) was a Pipit-class coastal minesweeper acquired by the United States Navy for use in World War II. Her task was to clear minefields in coastal waterways.

Plover was originally built by Harbor Boat Building Co., Terminal Island, Long Beach, California in 1936 as the wooden hull fishing trawler M/V Sea Rover. She was purchased on 16 October 1940 from Mr. John Rados, converted to a coastal minesweeper at Martinolich Shipbuilding Company., San Pedro, California and placed in service on 25 June 1941.

World War II West Coast Operations 
Based at San Pedro, California, Plover performed sweeping and patrol duties along the coast until placed out of service on 17 September 1944.

Decommissioned 
Struck from the Navy List on 14 October 1944, she was transferred to the Maritime Commission on 5 February 1945 and was returned to her former owner the same date.

References

External links 
 

Ships built in Los Angeles
1936 ships
Pipit-class coastal minesweepers
World War II minesweepers of the United States